ER or Er may refer to:

Places 

 English Republic, alternative name for the Commonwealth of England
 Eritrea (ISO 3166-2 two letter country code)

United States 

 East Rochester, New York
Erie, Pennsylvania

People 

 Er (biblical person), the eldest son of Judah in the biblical book of Genesis
 Nie Er (1912–1935), Chinese composer
 Elliot Rodger (July 24, 1991 – May 23, 2014), English-American incel mass shooter
 A Royal cypher representing a monarch
 Elizabeth Regina (ER), the royal cypher of Elizabeth I
 Edward Rex (ER / EVIIR), the royal cypher of Edward VII
 Edward Rex (ER / EVIIIR), the royal cypher of Edward VIII
 Elizabeth II Regina (EIIR), the royal cypher of Elizabeth II

Fictional characters 

 Er, a character in Plato's Myth of Er

Arts, entertainment and media

Music 

 Er, an album by Nils Petter Molvær
 "ER" (song), a 2012 single by Japanese boy band Kanjani Eight
 "ER", a song by Royce da 5'9" featuring Kid Vishis from Success Is Certain

Periodicals 

 Chico Enterprise-Record, the daily newspaper of Chico, California

Television 

 ER (TV series), a 1994–2009 American television medical drama series
 E/R, a 1984–1985 American television sitcom

Businesses and organizations 

 Astar Air Cargo (IATA designator ER)
 Eastern Railway (India)
 Eldorado Reno, a hotel and casino in Reno, Nevada
 Eldorado Resorts, a gaming company located in Reno, Nevada
 Entre Ríos Railway in Argentina (reporting mark ER)
 Estonian Reform Party
 United Russia, or Yedinaya Rossiya, a Russian political party

Finance and banking 

 ER, abbreviation of exchange rate
 ER, abbreviation of expense ratio

Language 

 Er (Cyrillic) (Р / р), a letter of the Cyrillic alphabet corresponding to the Latin letter "R"
 Er (cuneiform), a sign in cuneiform writing
 "er", a filler word in English
 Er, alternate spelling for Yer (Ъ / ъ), the hard-sign letter of the Cyrillic alphabet
 Suffix -er
 -er, a suffix added to adjectives or adverbs to form a comparative (e.g., fast to faster)
 -er, a suffix added to a noun to indicate resident of, as in New Yorker
 -er, a suffix added to a verb to make it an agent noun (e.g., cut to cutter)
 Oxford "-er", a suffix used to form words like rugger and footer
 Erhua (儿化), rhotacization of spoken syllables in Beijing dialect of Mandarin Chinese with the -er suffix (儿)

Science and technology 

 Erdős–Rényi model, a model in graph theory

Biology and medicine 

 Emergency room, or emergency department, in a medical facility
 Endoplasmic reticulum, a type of organelle in cell biology
 Er blood group system
 Equine exertional rhabdomyolysis, a syndrome that damages muscle tissue in horses
 Estrogen receptor, a type of protein molecule
 Extraction ratio, a pharmacokinetic property

Chemistry and physics 

 , a representation for relative static permittivity
 Electrorheological (ER) fluid, a type of chemical suspension
 Enantiomeric ratio, a concept in chemistry
 Erbium, symbol Er, a chemical element
 Einstein-Rosen bridge (ER) relativistic wormholes

Computing 

 .er, country code top-level domain  (ccTLD) for Eritrea
 Entity–relationship model, a conceptual representation of data
 Error Resilience, an audio coding method used in MPEG-4 Part 3

Other uses 

 Er., Hebrew abbreviation for 'Eruvin, the second tractate of Moed
 Earned run, a term in the game of baseball
 Emergency Response, incident response team or emergency procedure related to emergency services
 English Reports of the English Courts from 1220 to 1866
 Extended range (military)

See also 

 ERS (disambiguation)
 Err (disambiguation)
 
 
 
 
 Entre Ríos (disambiguation), several uses
 Erro (disambiguation)
 Error (disambiguation)
 Ur (disambiguation)